Pacific Coast Highway station is an at grade light rail station on the A Line of the Los Angeles Metro Rail system. The station is located in the median of Long Beach Boulevard at its intersection with Pacific Coast Highway, after which the station is named, in Long Beach, California.

North of this station, A Line trains enter an exclusive right-of-way (the historic route of the Pacific Electric Railway) which allows trains to reach higher speeds between stops.

Service

Station layout

Hours and frequency

Connections 
, the following connections are available:
Los Angeles Metro Bus:

References

A Line (Los Angeles Metro) stations
Transportation in Long Beach, California
Railway stations in the United States opened in 1990
1990 establishments in California